Cantelon is a surname. Notable people with the surname include:

Ben Cantelon (born 1983), Canadian musician
Paul Cantelon (born 1959), American composer
Philip L. Cantelon (born 1940), American businessman
Reg Cantelon (1902–1993), Canadian politician
Ron Cantelon (born 1943/1944), Canadian politician